Methanex Corporation is a Canadian company that supplies, distributes and markets methanol worldwide.

Methanex is the world’s largest producer and supplier of methanol to major international markets in North and South America, Europe, and Asia Pacific. Methanex is headquartered in Vancouver, British Columbia, Canada, and operates production sites in Canada, Chile, Egypt, New Zealand, the United States, and Trinidad and Tobago.  Its global operations are supported by an extensive global supply chain of terminals, storage facilities and the world’s largest dedicated fleet of methanol ocean tankers.

Methanex Corporation challenged California's plan to eliminate methyl tertiary butyl ether (MTBE) from gasoline on grounds of water pollution prevention, claiming protection under Chapter 11 of NAFTA and demanding $970 million in compensation from the state. The challenge was ultimately not successful and Methanex was ordered to reimburse the U.S. government $4 million in litigation costs.

In January 2012, Methanex announced it would move one of its idle Chilean plants to the United States.  Methanex later confirmed that they acquired land in Geismar, LA and Geismar would be the site in the United States where the idle Chilean plant would be moved to.  Methanex CEO, Bruce Aitken, confirmed in a press release on January 17, 2012 that the reason Methanex was shifting a methanol production plant from Chile to North America, specifically Louisiana, is due to the low price of natural gas available in North America and Louisiana.

Regional marketing offices are located in Belgium, Chile, China, Egypt, Korea, Japan, the United Arab Emirates, the United Kingdom and the United States.

Waterfront Shipping Ltd.
Methanex's majority owned subsidiary, Waterfront Shipping Limited, is a global marine transportation company that operates a fleet of 30 ocean tankers. In 2016, the company announced the delivery of seven first Korean and Japanese built methanol-fueled ocean tankers. Methanex and Mitsui O.S.K. Lines announced plans for a strategic partnership in July 2021, resulting in MOL's purchase of a 40% stake in WFS.

References

External links
Methanex Corporate Web Site
Waterfront Shipping Ltd.

Companies listed on the Toronto Stock Exchange
Companies listed on the Nasdaq
Chemical companies of Canada
Companies based in Vancouver